Take a Good Look may refer to:

 Take a Good Look (album), an album by Alyson
 Take a Good Look (TV series), an American television game show
 Take a Good Look (novel), a 1990 children's novel by Jacqueline Wilson